Rakotinci is a village in the municipality of Sopište, North Macedonia.

Demographics
As of the 2021 census, Rakotinci had 694 residents with the following ethnic composition:
Macedonians 575
Turks 47
Albanians 46
Persons for whom data are taken from administrative sources 16
Serbs 7
Vlachs 3

According to the 2002 census, the village had a total of 390 inhabitants. Ethnic groups in the village include:
Macedonians 389
Serbs 1

References

Villages in Sopište Municipality